Ardenode is a hamlet and ghost town in southern Alberta, Canada in Wheatland County, located  east of Highway 9,  northeast of Calgary.  It was founded as a railroad siding in 1913. The community takes its name from Ardenode in Ireland.

Demographics 
As a designated place in the 2016 Census of Population conducted by Statistics Canada, Ardenode recorded a population of 0 living in 1 of its 1 total private dwellings, no change from its 2011 population of 0.

As a designated place in the 2011 Census, Ardenode had a population of 0 living in 1 of its 1 total dwellings, no change from its 2006 population of 0.

See also 
List of communities in Alberta
List of ghost towns in Alberta

References 

Former designated places in Alberta
Localities in Wheatland County, Alberta